Sue Limb (born 1946, Hitchin, Hertfordshire) is a British writer and broadcaster.

Biography
Limb was born in Hitchin, Hertfordshire. She studied Elizabethan lyric poetry at Newnham College, Cambridge and then trained in education.

While her first published book was a biography of the Antarctic explorer Captain Lawrence Oates co-authored with Patrick Cordingley, later works are predominantly novels – many of them for young adults – and comedies for radio and television, often with a literary or historical setting.

Limb's debut novel Up the Garden Path was adapted as a BBC Radio 4 sitcom, and subsequently made the transition to ITV television.

For Radio 4, she has written a number of comedy series (which pay unusual attention to music and sound-effects): The Wordsmiths at Gorsemere (a pastiche of the poet William Wordsworth and his circle at Grasmere, two series), The Sit Crom (set in the English Civil War), Four Joneses and a Jenkins (a reference to Four Weddings and a Funeral); Alison and Maud; and most recently Gloomsbury, "a rhapsody about bohemians", about members of the Bloomsbury Group and starring Miriam Margolyes and Alison Steadman.

Other works include Growing Pains (a documentary about ageing), Hilaire Belloc, Cities (six programmes of literary anthology). and the introduction to her Newnham contemporary Valerie Grosvenor Myer's biography of Harriette Wilson.

Under the name Dulcie Domum, Limb wrote Bad Housekeeping, a humorous weekly column in The Guardian'''s Weekend section between 1988 and 2001. Collections of the columns, a feminist novelist's diaries of a rural idyll gone wrong, were published in book form. The books, reissued by Solidus Press in 2002, are listed below. 

In 1989, as Dulcie Domum, she coined the term "bonkbuster", which is a play on "blockbuster" and the verb "to bonk", which is British slang for sexual intercourse. In 2002 the Oxford English Dictionary recognized this portmanteau, defining it as "a type of popular novel characterized by frequent explicit sexual encounters between the characters." Limb commented on the honour, "It's an unexpected event. People keep telling me I've made my place in history, so I can die happily now."

Personal life 
She was briefly married in 1970, being the first of the five wives of the historian, Professor Roy Porter.

She lives on a remote organic farm near Wotton-under-Edge, near Nailsworth in Gloucestershire.

WorksCaptain Oates, Soldier and Explorer (with Patrick Cordingley), Batsford, 1982, Up the Garden Path, Transworld, 1984, Love Forty, Transworld, 1986The Wordsmiths at Gorsemere]], Bantam, 1987, Chicken Mission, Orchard, 1988, Tree Trouble, Orchard, 1988, Love's Labours, Transworld, 1989, Me Jane, Orchard, 1989, Big Trouble, Orchard, 1990, Dulcie Domum's Bad Housekeeping, Fourth Estate (reissued by Solidus Press 2002), 1990, Sheep's Eyes and Hogwash, Heinemann, 1992, More Bad Housekeeping, Fourth Estate (reissued by Solidus Press 2002), 1992, Come Back, Grandma, Red Fox, 1993, Dulcie Dishes the Dirt, Fourth Estate (reissued by Solidus Press 2002), 1994, Passion Fruit, Heinemann, 1995, Enlightenment, Heinemann, 1997, Dulcie Goes Native, Severn House (reissued by Solidus Press 2002), 1998, Big and Little (novel)|Big and Little, Orchard, 1999, You At The Back Stop Laughing, Beaver Books, 1999, China Lee (reissued as You're Amazing, Mr Jupiter), Orchard, 2004, Girl, 15, Charming But Insane, Bloomsbury, 2004, Girl (Nearly) 16: Absolute Torture, Bloomsbury, 2005, Girl 16: Pants on Fire, Bloomsbury, 2006, Ruby Rogers is a Waste of Space, Bloomsbury, 2006, Ruby Rogers: Yeah Whatever..., Bloomsbury, 2006, Girl, 15, Flirting for England, Bloomsbury, 2007, Zoe and Chloe: On the Prowl, Bloomsbury, 2007, Ruby Rogers is a Walking Legend, Bloomsbury, 2007, Girl, 16, Five-Star Fiasco, Bloomsbury, 2010Chocolate SOS'', Bloomsbury, 2012

References

External links
Sue Limb's website
 A Bad Housekeeping column by Limb (as 'Dulcie Domum') in Guardian Weekend, The Guardian, London, 31 March 2001

1946 births
Alumni of Newnham College, Cambridge
Date of birth missing (living people)
English women writers
Living people
People from Hitchin